Mohammed Vizarat Rasool Khan (22 December 1946 – 21 October 2013) was a member of Andhra Pradesh Legislative Assembly, founder and chairman Shadan Group of Educational Institutions. He was called "Sir Syed of Deccan".

He was a two-time MLA from the Asif nagar constituency – in 1984 and 1985. Both times he was elected on the Majlis ticket. In 1994 also he contested the election on the MBT ticket but lost to Indian National Congress candidate D. Nagender.

Though he dabbled in politics, Vizarat Rasool Khan is known more as an educationist. He had set up a string of 56 minority institutions, including 18 engineering, five pharmacy and four medical colleges. The first B.Ed. college in the Shadan group was established in April 1988 and first engineering college in 1995. He established first Muslim medical college and hospital for Girls after independence.

Positions held

M.L.A. (A.P) for two terms representing the Asif Nagar Assembly Constituency, 1984-1989. 
Served as the Chairman of A.P. State Minority Financial Corp. Ltd., Govt. of A.P. 1985

Personal life

He was survived by wife Begum Shadan Tahniyat and four sons: Nawab Mohammed Sarib Rasool Khan, Nawab Mohammed Saqib Rasool Khan, Nawab Mohammed Azib Rasool Khan, Nawab Mohammed Shah Alam Rasool Khan.

His brothers: Nawab Mohammed Wajahath Rasool Khan (Expired), Nawab Mohammed Virasath Rasool Khan (Ex.MLA), Nawab Mohammed Visasath Rasool Khan (Landlord).

His sisters: Dr Nuzath Nasreen (lives in UK), Dr Sarwath Parveen (Expired), Nudrath Nasreen (lives in Hyderabad).

As educationist

When Dr Khan was elected as MLA from Asifnagar constituency on MIM ticket, during his election rallies he realised the required need of Muslim minorities was not leaders but Education and started deeply thinking about how to get education reachable and affordable to the poorest and the poor. When a great opportunity came, Mr Nadendla Bhasker Roa wanted Dr Khan's support to form the government after toppling the NTR government. Dr Khan then negotiated and agreed to extend his support but only on a condition that Mr Nadendla Bhasker Rao sanction a Medical and an Engineering College for minorities and has taken permission on the name of Darusalam Educational Trust and established Deccan Medical college and Deccan College of Engineering where several Muslim minorities are still being benefited. A time came when after 1990 he left electoral politics and started concentrating where it mattered the most for him.
He established Shadan group of institutions in 1988 on his wife's name by establishing a B.Ed. College. Presently Shadan group runs four medical colleges, Shadan Institute of Medical Sciences (SIMS), Dr Vizarath Rasool Khan Women's Medical College (DR VRK), Nimra Institute of Medical Sciences (NIMS), Ayaan Institute of Medical Sciences (AIMS), 8 engineering colleges offering B.Tech., M.Tech., 5 pharmacy colleges offering B.Pharmacy, M.Pharmacy, Pharma.D., 6 PG Colleges offering  MBA, MCA, 3 Nursing Colleges offering B.Sc., M.Sc. nursing, Para Medical college, Physiotherapy college, and B.Ed. College, and Degree, PG, junior and degree colleges.

Vizarat Rasool Khan earned the title of Sir Syed of Deccan (South India). In 2003 he started Shadan Institute of Medical Sciences in Rangareddy, Hyderabad, Telangana. The institute is 1000-bed hospital attached to a medical college of 150 students offering UG and PG as per the Medical Council of India, N.M.C. Then in 2011 he started a separate medical college for Muslim women, Dr. V.R.K. women's medical college the first women's medical college after the independence of India, which is the country's first women's medical college a landmark achievement.

In April 2012 he received the 'Lifetime achievement award' from the Khan Bahadur Babukhan Foundation.

Death

On 21 October 2013, Dr Vizarat Rasool Khan died at Apollo Hospital undergoing treatment. He was suffering from prolonged illness and was frequently in and out of hospital.

His last rites were performed in around his educational institutes. His Namaz-e-Janaza was offered on Tuesday afternoon after Zohar prayer at Masjid-e-Shadan near its women's engineering college and burial took place at Shadan Institute of Medical Sciences at Himayat sagar road.

References

External links
http://www.shadan.org/
 http://www.nimra.in

1946 births
2013 deaths
Founders of Indian schools and colleges
Members of the Andhra Pradesh Legislative Assembly
Politicians from Hyderabad, India
Majlis Bachao Tehreek politicians